Tropical Storm Nangka, also known in the Philippines as Tropical Depression Nika, was a weak tropical cyclone which impacted Hainan and parts of Indochina, which had been affected by Tropical Storm Linfa just days earlier. Nangka in total caused 4 deaths and 5 missing in China and Vietnam.

Meteorological history 

On October 11, 2020, the Japan Meteorological Agency (JMA) began tracking a tropical depression off the west coast of Luzon. The PAGASA declared the system as a tropical depression at 12:00 UTC, and since the storm formed inside of the Philippine Area of Responsibility (PAR) the agency named the system Nika. On the same day at 21:00, the Joint Typhoon Warning Center began issuing warnings on the system. On October 12, the system was declared a tropical storm by the JMA, and was named Nangka. At 9:00, the system left the PAR and the PAGASA issued its final bulletin on the system. At 19:20 CST (11:20 UTC) on October 13, Nangka made landfall over Qionghai, Hainan. The system continued tracking westward, returning to open water, before making a second landfall in Ninh Bình, Vietnam on October 14. As the system tracked further inland, it dissipated over Laos on the same day.

Preparations and impact

Philippines 
The combined effects of Nangka and the southwest monsoon brought rainfall over much of the country. Gale warnings were issued over much of the Luzon coastline, with sea travel being described as risky by the PAGASA. Parts of Metro Manila were flooded, with some parts of EDSA becoming impassable for some vehicles due to gutter-deep floodwaters.

Hong Kong 
Stock markets, schools, and businesses were closed in Hong Kong.

Mainland China 
After the passage of Nangka over Hainan Island, 2 people died and 4 are missing as a result of a capsized boat.

Vietnam 

In preparation for Nangka more than 150,000 people in Vietnam were evacuated from their homes. Some Vietnamese provinces banned vessels from heading out to sea during the storm. Vinh Airport in Nghe An Province and Tho Xuan Airport in Thanh Hoa Province were closed on October 14. Vietnam Airlines and Pacific Airlines announced that eight flights were cancelled to the two airports. Wind gust packed  was reported in Nam Định. In totals, the storm caused 2 deaths and 1 missing in Vietnam. Damage in Nam Định Province valued at VND 68 billion (US$2.94 million).

See also 

 Weather of 2020
 Tropical cyclones in 2020
 Tropical Storm Mujigae (2009)
 Typhoon Parma (2009)
 Tropical Storm Mirinae (2016)
 Tropical Storm Son-Tinh (2018)
 Tropical Storm Sinlaku (2020) – a storm that had a similar track two months before.

References

External links 

 Japan Meteorological Agency's website
 Joint Typhoon Warning Center's website

Western Pacific tropical storms
Typhoons in China
Tropical cyclones in 2020
2020 Pacific typhoon season